The Hiawatha First Nation (formerly Mississaugas of Rice Lake) is a Mississauga Ojibwe First Nations reserve located on the north shore of Rice Lake east of the Otonabee River in Ontario, Canada.

It is found in Otonabee Township less than 15 kilometres south of the centre of Peterborough. Its name derives from the Iroquois Confederacy co-founder Hiawatha.

History

Indigenous peoples occupied this area for thousands of years before European contact. Nearly 2000 years ago, people of the Point Peninsula complex built a series of earthen mounds for ceremonial, religious and burial purposes.  Archaeological excavations have shown the people had sophisticated knowledge to build the massive earthworks. Nine mounds or burial places have been located at the south end of the park.  Serpent Mounds Park includes an effigy mound, four to six feet high and nearly two hundred feet long, with a related egg-shaped mound by its mouth.

Population
In 2006 the population was 483, a 62.6% increase since 2001. There were 195 private dwellings.

Indian Reserves
Indian reserves assigned to the First Nation are:
Hiawatha First Nation Indian Reserve, 6 km southeast of Peterborough 868.20 ha. 
Islands in the Trent Waters Indian Reserve 36A, in Peterborough County, comprising islands in Pigeon, Buckhorn and Stony Lakes. 139.60 ha. - this reserve is shared with 2 other First Nations.

References

External links
Hiawatha First Nation - Mississaugas of Rice Lake
Copy of the Treaty Made November 15, 1923 between his Majesty the King and the Mississauga Indians of Rice Lake, Mud Lake, Scugog Lake and Alderville
A History of the Rice Lake Indians by Mary Jane Muskratte Simpson, Alderville, 1953
Indian and Northern Affairs Canada - First Nation Profile

First Nations governments in Ontario
Mississaugas
Association of Iroquois and Allied Indians
Communities in Peterborough County
Mississauga reserves in Ontario